It may mean:

 Dani Güiza
 Güiza River